Ykiki Beat was a five-piece indie pop band from Tokyo, Japan.

In January, 2017, they announced they had been on hiatus from December, 2016 and that they would disband. They also announced that each member would continue to make music their own way.  Three members of the band, Akiyama, Kachi, and Kamoto, are currently members of four-piece indie rock band DYGL. Drummer Mizuki Sekigushi is currently a member of four-piece indie rock band Cairophenomenons.

Band members

 Nobuki Akiyama – lead vocals, guitars
 Kohei Kamoto - guitar
 Koki Nozue - synthesizer
 Yotaro Kachi - bass
 Mizuki Sekiguchi - drum

Discography

Albums

Studio albums

Extended plays

Singles

As lead artist

Promotional singles

Other appearances

References

External links

Japanese alternative rock groups
Musical groups established in 2012
2012 establishments in Japan
Musical groups from Tokyo